Yun Sang-sik (born 20 September 1968) is a South Korean judoka. He competed in the men's half-heavyweight event at the 1992 Summer Olympics.

References

1968 births
Living people
South Korean male judoka
Olympic judoka of South Korea
Judoka at the 1992 Summer Olympics
Place of birth missing (living people)